Wong Kay Poh (born 15 August 1929) was a Singaporean weightlifter. He competed in the men's middleweight event at the 1956 Summer Olympics. Wong retired from weightlifting after his Olympics' participation.

References

External links
 

1929 births
Possibly living people
Singaporean male weightlifters
Olympic weightlifters of Singapore
Weightlifters at the 1956 Summer Olympics
Sportspeople from Hainan
20th-century Singaporean people